Chelatococcus  is a genus of bacteria from the order of Hyphomicrobiales

References

Hyphomicrobiales
Bacteria genera